Vladimir Dmitriyevich Novikov (25 June 1937 – 1980) was a Russian water polo player. He won a silver medal with the Soviet team at  the 1960 Summer Olympics. He played one match.

See also
 List of Olympic medalists in water polo (men)

References

External links
 

1937 births
1980 deaths
Russian male water polo players
Soviet male water polo players
Olympic water polo players of the Soviet Union
Water polo players at the 1960 Summer Olympics
Olympic silver medalists for the Soviet Union
Olympic medalists in water polo
Medalists at the 1960 Summer Olympics